The Saturn-Shuttle was a preliminary concept of launching the Space Shuttle orbiter using a modified version of the first stage of the Saturn V rocket. It was studied and considered in 1971–1972.

Description 
An interstage would be fitted on top of the S-IC stage to support the external tank in the space occupied by the S-II stage in the Saturn V. It was an alternative to the SRBs.

The addition of wings (and some form of landing gear) on the S-IC stage would allow the booster to fly back to the Kennedy Space Center, where technicians would then refurbish the booster (by replacing only the five F-1 engines and reusing the tanks and other hardware for later flights).

The Shuttle would handle space station logistics, while the Saturn V would launch components.

This would have allowed the International Space Station, using a Skylab or Mir configuration with both U.S. and Russian docking ports, to have been lifted with just a handful of launches. The Saturn-Shuttle concept also would have eliminated the Space Shuttle Solid Rocket Boosters that ultimately precipitated the Space Shuttle Challenger accident in 1986.

See also
Buran programme
Boeing X-20 Dyna-Soar
X-37
Dream Chaser
List of launch vehicle designs

References

External links
 
 Saturn Shuttle with Flyback Booster, video rendering by Hazegrayart

Further reading
 Phase B' Shuttle contractor studies 1971 - describes and shows some of the S-1C based proposals.
 Phase B' Shuttle cost tradeoffs 1971 - shows HO BRB and S-1C derived HO flyback options.

Apollo program
Space Shuttle program
Shuttle
Cancelled space launch vehicles